The 2013 Memphis Tigers football team represented the University of Memphis in the 2013 NCAA Division I FBS football season. The Tigers were led by second year head coach Justin Fuente and played their home games at the Liberty Bowl Memorial Stadium in Memphis, Tennessee. The Tigers competed as a member of the American Athletic Conference. They finished the season 3–9, 1–7 in American Athletic play to finish in a tie for ninth place.  Tom Hornsey won the Ray Guy Award, which honors college football's best punter

Schedule

References

Memphis
Memphis Tigers football seasons
Memphis Tigers football